The Lago Blanco tuco-tuco (Ctenomys fodax) is a species of rodent in the family Ctenomyidae. It is known only from the Lago Blanco area in southern Argentina. Its karyotype has 2n = 28 and FN = 42.

References

Tuco-tucos
Mammals of Argentina
Mammals of Patagonia
Mammals described in 1910
Taxa named by Oldfield Thomas